Dahteste  (circa 1860–1955) was a Chokonen Apache woman warrior.

Family 
Dahteste was the sister of Ilth-goz-ay, the wife of Chihuahua (also known as Kla-esh), chief of the Chokonen local group of the Chokonen band of the Chiricahua.

Career 
In her youth she rode with Cochise's band in southeastern Arizona. Despite being married with children, Dahteste took part in raiding parties with her first husband Ahnandia. She was later a compatriot of Geronimo and companion of Lozen on many raids. Dahteste was fluent in English and acted as messenger and translator for the Apache. With Lozen, she became a mediator and trusted scout at times for the U.S. Cavalry and was instrumental in negotiating Geronimo's final surrender to the U.S. Cavalry in 1886.

Prison 
She spent eight years as prisoner of war at Fort Marion in St. Augustine in Florida, where she survived pneumonia and tuberculosis. Thereafter she was shipped to a military prison in Fort Sill, Oklahoma. During the confinement she and Ahnandia divorced in the "Apache way".

Later life 
After nineteen years of imprisonment at Fort Sill, Dahteste lived out the rest of her life at Whitetail on the Mescalero Apache Reservation in New Mexico. She married a former Apache Scout named Kuni, dressed traditionally and refused to speak English. She was known to others as "Old Mrs. Coonie" until her death in 1955.

Literature 
 Karl Lassiter, The Warrior's Path, Kensington Publishing Corporation, 1998.
 Philippe Morvan, Ours, Calmann-Levy, 2018.

References 

Chiricahua people
1860 births
1955 deaths
19th-century Native American women
19th-century Native Americans
Native American people of the Indian Wars
Native American rebels
Native American women in warfare
Women in 19th-century warfare
20th-century Native American women
20th-century Native Americans